Anopina confusa is a moth of the family Tortricidae. It is found in Guerrero, Mexico.

The length of the forewings is about 7 mm. The forewing have a white, silky shining ground colour. The base and eight transverse fasciae are brownish ochreous. The hindwings are shining white, with some greyish speckling along the margins and on the under surface.

References

Moths described in 1962
confusa
Moths of Central America